The eastern Orphean warbler (Curruca crassirostris) is a typical warbler of the genus Curruca. This species occurs in summer around the Mediterranean, through the Balkans via Turkey, the Caucasus and surrounding regions to Central Asia. It is migratory, wintering in sub-Saharan Africa.

At 15–16 cm length—somewhat larger than a blackcap—this is one of the largest species of typical warblers. The adult males have a plain grey back. The bill is long and pointed and the legs black. The male has a dark grey head, black eye mask, and white throat. The iris is white. Females and immatures have a paler head and reddish underparts; their grey back has a brownish tinge. The iris is dark in young birds. The song is a series of warbling  and scolding notes. Its song is more varied than that of the western Orphean warbler, approaching the Nightingale in richness.

These small passerine birds are found in open deciduous woodland. 4–6 eggs are laid in a nest in a bush or tree. Like most "warblers", the eastern Orphean warbler is an insectivore.

External links 
 Ageing and sexing (PDF) by Javier Blasco-Zumeta
 

eastern Orphean warbler
Birds of Europe
Birds of Azerbaijan
Birds of Western Asia
Birds of Afghanistan
Birds of Pakistan
Birds of Central Asia
eastern Orphean warbler
eastern Orphean warbler